Jaime Martins Barata (7 March 1899, Santo António das Areias - 15 May 1970, Lisbon) was a Portuguese painter and scholar.

Biography

Jaime Martins Barata was born on March 7, 1899, in Alentejo, Portugal.  He grew up in Póvoa e Meadas, a small village not far from the Spanish border.  His father, José Pedro Barata, was superintendent at a rural estate; his mother, Antónia de Jesus Martins, a primary-school teacher.  In 1904, José Pedro Barata died, survived by his wife and two sons.  Despite the significant financial strain, Antónia Martins Barata managed to put her children through high-school; and, seeing their good academic performance, later decided to move to Lisbon, where they continued their studies.

From very early on, Jaime had a great variety of interests and was unsure what course of studies to take.  He first enrolled in the Escola Normal Superior with a view at becoming a mathematics teacher.  For a while, he also studied economics in the Escola Superior de Comércio.  But the idea of becoming an economist never really attracted him, and he went back to the initial plan of being a school teacher.  From 1922 to 1947, he taught arts and mathematics at some of Lisbons leading highschools.

As a teenager, Jaime was already an accomplished watercolor painter, though he considered painting to be a hobby rather than a professional career.  It was with this spirit that, while studying to become a teacher, he frequented the halls of the Sociedade Nacional de Belas-Artes, Portugals leading arts society.  Here he was introduced to a generation of artists — painters, sculptors, architects — with whom he shared his interests in painting.  Some of these acquaintances led to professional collaborations and lifelong friendships.  Martins Barata's "best pal" was José Manuel Leitão de Barros.  The two amateur watercolor painters eventually married two sisters, Màmia and Helena, who happened to be daughters of Roque Gameiro and also watercolor painters.

One of the first collaborations among the group of young artists was a series of illustrated magazines (Domingo Ilustrado, ABC, ABCzinho, Notícias Ilustrado), where Jaime worked on a part-time basis as photojournalist and illustrator.  His work as an illustrator continued throughout the years, including books of important historic and documentary interest.

1940 was the year of the Portuguese World Expo.  This was a major event not only in Portuguese politics but also in Portuguese art: under the direction of Cottinelli Telmo, a great number of artists — by and large with little regard to their political leanings — collaborated in this great project.  Martins Barata was invited to paint a series of large panels representing scenes from the history of Portugal.  This was the first of a long series of large-scale paintings, initially in the oil medium and later, beginning with Romes St Eugene basilica, in the fresco technique.

The Portuguese World Expo was also the occasion for another new line of artistic creation: Martins Barata was invited by the Portuguese Post Office to design a commemorative stamp of the event.  Following this, a number of other stamp design projects were commissioned.  Some years later (1947) Martins Barata was appointed art consultant to the Portuguese post office, a position he occupied until his retirement.

With this appointment and the increasing number of large-scale paintings he was commissioned, Martins Barata abandoned his career as school teacher — and also reduced the time dedicated to watercolor painting.  He now spent much of his time learning and perfecting the different techniques and mediums required for his new line of work.  The price of this effort was that, aside for the works he was commissioned, his painting output was relatively scarce (save for a number of incomplete studies, sometimes repetitions of the same study).

Large-scale painting perhaps constitutes the core of Martins Baratas ouvre as a painter.  Most of these works were commissioned by the government and destined to public buildings like courts of justice and government ministries. Many of them were fresco mural paintings.  As a result, they are geographically dispersed and not easily accessible.

Although teaching and painting were his main professional occupations, Jaime Martins Barata was a man of many interests and talents.  Anyone who visited his studio (a large, three-story-high building) came across innumerable mechanisms, objects and gadgets he invented or perfected in order to facilitate the task of painting large surfaces (or for other purposes).  He was a very practical, ingenious person.

Several other examples could be given of the variety of Martins Baratas contributions.  For example, beginning in the 1930s and until the end of his life, he actively participated in the historical debate over the transition to the Portuguese caravel of the 15th century, the ship that revolutionized ocean navigation.

Personal life
On 5 January 1926, Jaime Martins Barata married Maria Emília (Màmia) Roque Gameiro. They had four children: Maria Antónia, José Pedro, Alfredo and Maria da Assunção.

Works

Books
 J. M. Leitão de Barros and Jaime Martins Barata, Elementos de História da Arte Para Uso da 4ª e 5ª Classes dos Liceus ("Elements of History of Art for 4th and 5th Graders," in Portuguese), 3rd Edition, Lisboa: Edições Paulo Guedes, 1931.
 Luiz Passos and Jaime Martins Barata, Elementos de Desenho ("Principles of Drawing," in Portuguese),  Lisbon: Sá da Costa, 1937.
 Norberto de Araújo (text) and Jaime Martins Barata (illustrations), Peregrinações em Lisboa ("Lisbon Pilgrimages," in Portuguese), Lisbon: Parceria A.M. Pereira, 1939.

References

Notes

Bibliography

 Museu da Cidade de Lisboa, "Retrospectiva da Obra do Pintor Martins Barata," Lisbon: Câmara Municipal de Lisboa, 1988.
 Mário Elias. "Martins Barata, Pintor Alentejano." In IBN MARUÁN Revista Cultural do Concelho de Marvão. N.º 7, Marvão: Câmara Municipal de Marvão / Edições Colibri, Dezembro de 1997, pp. 295–298.

External links
"www.martinsbarata.org" Martins Barata website.
"A Tribo dos Pincéis" a website devoted to Roque Gameiro and his family.

1899 births
1970 deaths
20th-century Portuguese painters
20th-century Portuguese male artists
Portuguese male painters